The following is a partial list of notable residents, past and present, from Bend, Oregon, a city in Central Oregon in the western part of the United States of America. A separate list of people from Oregon is available.

 Broda Otto Barnes, physician, hypothyroidism researcher
 Shannon Bex, member of the musical group Danity Kane
 Mohini Bhardwaj, Olympic gymnast
 Drew Bledsoe, former NFL quarterback
 Ian Boswell, racing cyclist for 
 Allie Brosh, author, Hyperbole and a Half
 Pat Cashman, comedian, television and radio personality
 John Chambers, CEO of Cisco Corporation; part-time resident
 Ray W. Clough, professor emeritus at UC-Berkeley, founder of the finite element method
 Kent Couch, lawn-chair balloonist
 Adam Craig, professional mountain bike racer and Olympian
 Kiki Cutter, Olympic and World Cup ski champion
 Thomas Del Ruth, cinematographer
Nate Doss, professional disc golfer and brewer; three-time PDGA World Champion
 Brian Dunning, science author and film producer; runs Skeptoid Inc
 Ashton Eaton, 2012 and 2016 Olympic gold medalist, world record holder in both the decathlon and heptathlon
 Alan Embree, former Major League Baseball player
 Myrlie Evers-Williams, civil rights activist
 Ben Ferguson, professional snowboarder
 Jon Fogarty, professional race car driver currently with GAINSCO/Bob Stallings Racing
 Tommy Ford, professional ski racer and Olympian
 Matthew Fox, television actor on the series Lost
 Michael Garrison, electronic musician
 Jere Gillis, former NHL player
 Scott Goldblatt, 2000 Olympic silver medalist, 2004 Olympic gold medalist in swimming
 Paul Hait, Olympic gold medalist
 Ray Hatton, college professor, author, and long-distance runner 
 Chris Horner, pro road racing cyclist, winner of the 2013 Vuelta a España
 Steve House, mountain climber, first non-European winner of Piolet d'Or Award
 Stan Humphries, former NFL quarterback
 Dave Hunt, founder of the Berean Call ministry
 Sara Jackson-Holman, singer-songwriter
Valarie Jenkins, professional disc golfer and brewer; four-time PDGA World Champion
 Jason Keep, basketball player
 Donald M. Kerr, conservationist and founder of the High Desert Museum
 Rustin R. Kimsey, Episcopalian bishop
 Gary Lewis, outdoor writer for ESPN, author and TV host
 Ryan Longwell, NFL place kicker
 Gerry Lopez, Hawaiian surfing legend and film actor ("Conan the Barbarian")
 Robert D. Maxwell, Medal of Honor recipient
 Donald L. McFaul, U.S. Navy SEAL killed in Panama in 1989
 J. Patrick Metke, politician and businessman
 Jourdan Miller, fashion model and winner of America's Next Top Model, cycle 20
 Chino Moreno, musician and lead singer of Deftones
 William A. Niskanen, former chairman of the Council of Economic Advisers in the Reagan administration; former chairman of the Cato Institute
 Paul Phillips, professional poker player
 George P. Putnam, publisher; husband of Amelia Earhart
Jeremy Roloff, TV personality, Little People Big World
 Grant Rosenberg, TV writer-producer and author
 Laurenne Ross, Olympic alpine ski racer
 Beckie Scott, 2002 Olympic gold medalist in cross country skiing
 John Spence, first American combat frogman 
 David Stoliar, sole survivor of the Struma disaster
 Conrad Stoltz, three-time XTERRA off-road triathlon champion
 Byron A. Stover, businessman and state legislator 
 Mickey Tettleton, former Major League Baseball player
 Andy Tillman, llama rancher, businessman, and author
 Ryan Trebon, professional mountain bike and cyclocross racer
 April Genevieve Tucholke, novelist
 Andreas Wecker, Olympic horizontal bar gold medalist in 1996
 Gary Zimmerman, NFL player, inducted into the Pro Football Hall of Fame in 2008

References

 
Bend
Bend, Oregon